Lasiocercis elegantula is a species of beetle in the family Cerambycidae. It was described by Fairmaire in 1899.

References

Lasiocercis
Beetles described in 1899